Agapanthia amurensis is a species of longhorn beetle in the subfamily Lamiinae found in Mongolia, North Korea and Russia.

References

amurensis
Beetles described in 1879
Beetles of Asia